Matt Bersano (born September 10, 1992) is an American professional soccer player who plays for Major League Soccer club Austin FC.

Career

Youth, College and Amateur
After spending his youth career with the Real Salt Lake AZ academy, Bersano began his college career at Oregon State University.  He made a total of 54 appearances and recorded 14 clean sheets for the Beavers before transferring to Penn State University in 2015.  In his lone season with the Nittany Lions, Bersano made 13 appearances and finished with a 1.19 Goals Against Average and five clean sheets.

He also played in the Premier Development League for Lane United FC.

Professional

Seattle Sounders 2
On March 24, 2016, Bersano signed a professional contract with USL club Seattle Sounders FC 2.  He ended up making his professional debut on September 11, coming on as a sub in the 81st minute for the injured Charlie Lyon in S2's away match at Oklahoma City Energy.  The match ended in a 2–2 draw.

San Jose Earthquakes
Bersano signed with Major League Soccer side San Jose Earthquakes on March 13, 2017. He was subsequently loaned out to San Jose's USL affiliate Reno 1868 FC, where he was named the team's Goalkeeper of the Year at the end of the season. He was recalled to San Jose for the 2018 season, having won the backup position to Andrew Tarbell after Tarbell replaced David Bingham as the starting keeper and Bingham was traded to the LA Galaxy.

Austin FC
On January 3, 2023, Bersano signed with MLS side Austin FC.

Career Statistics

References

External links
 S2 bio
 Penn State University bio
 Prospect XI bio
 

1992 births
Living people
American soccer players
Association football goalkeepers
Lane United FC players
Oregon State Beavers men's soccer players
Penn State Nittany Lions men's soccer players
Reno 1868 FC players
San Jose Earthquakes players
Tacoma Defiance players
Austin FC players
Soccer players from Arizona
Sportspeople from Tempe, Arizona
USL Championship players
USL League Two players
MLS Next Pro players
Major League Soccer players